William Henry Brian Hogg (30 April 195530 April 2020), better known by his stage name BJ Hogg, was a Northern Irish actor best known for playing Big Mervyn in the BBC sitcom Give My Head Peace. He also played the title role in the Oscar-nominated short film Dance Lexie Dance and appeared as Addam Marbrand in Game of Thrones.

Personal life
He was born in Lisburn on 30 April 1955. He had two sisters, one his twin. He originally trained to be a chef, but stopped working in hotels after two of them were bombed while on duty. He spent several years as a musician before turning to acting.

He married his wife, Elish, in 1981.

Career

Stage
He appeared in the Arts and Lyric theatres in Northern Ireland as well as on stage in London and Moscow.

Television
As well as Give My Head Peace and Game of Thrones, he appeared in The Fall as the father of a murder victim and The Frankenstein Chronicles.

Film
As well as Dance Lexie Dance, he starred in City of Ember, Hunger, Closing the Ring and Divorcing Jack.

Death
He died at home on his 65th birthday on 30 April 2020.

Filmography

References

External links

People from Lisburn
1955 births
2020 deaths
Actors from Northern Ireland
Male television actors from Northern Ireland